Aeschines of Miletus (Gr. ) was a contemporary of Cicero, and a distinguished orator in the Asiatic style of eloquence, which, according to Cicero, "rushes with an impetuous stream.  But it is not merely fluent; its language is ornate and polished."

Aeschines is said by Diogenes Laërtius to have written on politics. He died in exile on account of having spoken too freely to Pompey.

References

Ancient Greek rhetoricians
Roman-era Milesians